is a railway station on the Nara Line in Fushimi-ku, Kyoto, Japan, operated by West Japan Railway Company (JR West). The station number is JR-D03. It is the closest station to Fushimi Inari-taisha Shrine.

Layout
The station has two side platforms, serving one track each.

Platforms

Passenger statistics
According to the Kyoto Prefecture statistical report, the average number of passengers per day is as follows.

Adjacent stations

Surrounding area
Inari Station serves visitors to several nearby sites. Among these are the major Shinto shrine Fushimi Inari-taisha and the Fukakusa campus of Ryukoku University. Although transfer is not available,  and Fushimi-Inari Stations on the Keihan Main Line are close by. Students and staff members can access Ritsumeikan Junior & Senior High School and Kyoto Municipal Fushimi Technical High School (the setting of School Wars: HERO) from Inari Station.

History
Station numbering was introduced in March 2018 with Inari being assigned station number JR-D03.

See also
Fushimi-Inari Station (Keihan)

References

External links

 

Railway stations in Japan opened in 1879
Railway stations in Kyoto Prefecture
Stations of West Japan Railway Company